Darawan is a village in Bhogpur. Bhogpur is a city in the district Jalandhar of Indian state of Punjab.

About 
Darawan lies on the Bhogpur-Adampur road which is almost 3 km from it.
The nearest railway station to Darawan is Adampur railway station at a distance of 8.5 km.

Post code 
Darawan's Post office is Salala whose post code is 144102.

References 

  Official website of Punjab Govt. with Darawan's details

Villages in Jalandhar district